John Joce (fl. 1402) was an English politician.

He was a Member (MP) of the Parliament of England for Newcastle-under-Lyme in 1402.

References

14th-century births
15th-century deaths
English MPs 1402
Members of the Parliament of England for Newcastle-under-Lyme